Part XII of constitution of India is a compilation of laws pertaining to Finance, Property, Contracts and Suits for Republic of India.

Chapter I - Finance 
Articles 264 - 291 on Finance  (Articles 264 - 267 - General; Articles 268 - 281 - Distribution of Revenues between the Union and the States; Articles 282 - 291 - Miscellaneous Financial Provisions ) 

 A-264. Interpretation.
 A-265. Taxes not to be imposed save to be by authority of law.
 A-266. Consolidated Funds and public accounts of India and of the States.
 A-267. Contingency Fund. 
 A-268. Duties levied by the Union but collected and appropriated by the States.
 A-268A . Omitted.
 A-269. Taxes levied and collected by the Union but assigned to the States.
 A-269A . Levy and collection of goods and services tax in course of inter-State trade or commerce
 A-270. Taxes levied and distributed between the Union and the States
 A-271. Surcharge on certain duties and taxes for purposes of the Union.
 A-272 - Omitted.
 A-273. Grants in lieu of export duty on jute and jute products.
 A-274. Prior recommendation of President required to Bills affecting taxation in which States are interested.
 A-275. Grants from the Union to certain States.
 A-276. Taxes on professions, trades, callings and employments.
 A-277. Savings.
 A-278 - Omitted.
 A-279 - Calculation of “net proceeds”, etc. 
 A-279A. Goods and Services Tax Council.
 A-280. Finance Commission.
 A-281. Recommendations of the Finance Commission.
 A-282. Expenditure defrayable by the Union or a State out of its revenues.
 A-283. Custody, etc., of Consolidated Funds, Contingency Funds and moneys credited to the public accounts
 A-284. Custody of suitors’ deposits and other moneys received by public servants and courts.
 A-285. Exemption of property of the Union from State taxation.
 A-286. Restrictions as to imposition of tax on the sale or purchase of goods.
 A-287. Exemption from taxes on electricity.
 A-288. Exemption from taxation by States in respect of water or electricity in certain cases.
 A-289. Exemption of property and income of a State from Union taxation.
 A-290. Adjustment in respect of certain expenses and pensions.
 A-290A.. Annual payment to certain Devaswom Funds.
 A-291. Omitted.

Chapter II - Borrowing 
Articles 292 - 293 

 A-292. Borrowing by the Government of India.
 A-293. Borrowing by States.

Chapter III - Property, Contracts, Rights, Liabilities, Obligations and Suits 
Articles 294 - 300 

 A-294. Succession to property, assets, rights, liabilities and obligations in certain cases.
 A-295. Succession to property, assets, rights, liabilities and obligations in other cases.
 A-296. Property accruing by escheat or lapse or as bona vacantia.
 A-297. Things of value within territorial waters or continental shelf and resources of the exclusive economic zone to vest in the Union.
 A-298. Power to carry on trade, etc.
 A-299. Contracts.
 A-300. Suits and proceedings.

Chapter IV - Right to Property
Article 300A  

 A-300A. Persons not to be deprived of property save by authority of law.

References
Sources

Part XII text from wikisource

Part 12